Chano Lobato (December 1927 in Cadiz – 5 April 2009 in Seville) was a Spanish flamenco singer.

Born in the Santa María neighborhood of Cadiz, he began performing at nightclubs in his hometown and later moved to Madrid, where he joined Alejandro Vega's Flamenco dance group.  He became well known for performing with Antonio El Bailarín in particular, but also Manuel Morao and El Serna and for various notable dancers, including Matilde Coral.

In 1974  Lobato received the Enrique El Mellizo award at the national contest Concurso Nacional de Córdoba and in 1996 he received the Medalla de Andalucía (Medal of Andalusia).

Chano Lobato made many recordings. Amongst the most recent are:
1996 La Nuez Mosca
1997 Aromas de Cadiz
1997 Con sabor a cuarto
1998 El Flamenco Vive 2CD
2000 Azucar Cande
2000 Que viente anos no es nada
2002 Romea
2003 Memorias de Cadiz

According to writer and flamencologist Manuel Ríos Ruiz, "Chano Lobato is an artist who gets emotional when he sings, who gets drunk with his singing, and quickly transmits his purest essence to the knowledgeable enthusiasts".

Discography
Albums
Chano Lobato made many recordings. Amongst the most recent are:

1996 La Nuez Mosca

1997 Aromas de Cadiz

1997 Con sabor a cuarto

1998 El Flamenco Vive 2CD

2000 Azucar Cande

2000 Que viente anos no es nada

2002 Romea

2003 Memorias de Cadiz

Contributing artist
 The Rough Guide to Flamenco (1997, World Music Network)

Bibliography 
 Chano Lobato. Toda la sal de la bahía. VV.AA. Ayto. La Unión, 2007
 Chano Lobato. Memorias de Cádiz. Marqués J.M. y Téllez, J.J.. Dip. Cádiz, 2003

References

Flamenco singers
1927 births
2009 deaths
People from Cádiz
20th-century Spanish singers
20th-century Spanish male singers